Hydrogenophaga is a genus of bacteria from the family of Comamonadaceae with one known species (Hylemonella gracilis). Hylemonella gracilis has been isolated from pondwater.

References

Comamonadaceae
Bacteria genera
Monotypic bacteria genera